Kishore Kumar Mohanty was an Indian politician who served as Member of Rajya Sabha from Odisha, Speaker and Member of Odisha Legislative Assembly from Jharsuguda Assembly constituency and Brajarajnagar Assembly constituency and Chairman of Western Odisha Development Council.

Personal life 
He was born in 4 December 1958. In 30 December 2021, he died at the age of 63 due to a massive cardiac arrest while attending a meeting in Janta Dal United Office, Jharsuguda, after that he was rushed to a private hospital where he died. His wife Alka Mohanty succeeded him as Member of the Legislative Assembly. In 2019 Odisha Legislative Assembly election, he defeated Radharani Panda, former MLA by 80,152 votes with rate of 49% and margin of 11,634.

Honors 
In his death, Naveen Patnaik, Chief Minister of Odisha said "He was an efficient and popular leader of the party"
In July 2022, obituaries were also paid to him in the Parliament of India

References

External link 

 Kishore Kumar Mohanty at Odisha Legislative Assembly
 Candidate Details of Kishore Kumar Mohanty at Election Commission of India

1958 births
2021 deaths
Indian politicians
Members of the Rajya Sabha
Rajya Sabha members from Odisha
Members of the Odisha Legislative Assembly
Speakers of the Odisha Legislative Assembly
Odisha MLAs 2019–2024
Odisha MLAs 2004–2009
Odisha MLAs 2000–2004
Odisha MLAs 1990–1995